Cecil Stanley Harrison, CMG OBE (17 November 1902 – 14 April 1962) was Bailiff of Jersey from 1961 to 1962.

Portrait 
The artist Herbert James Gunn created a portrait of Harrison in 1964. The painting is located in Jersey's Royal Court.

References

External links 
 Cecil Stanley Harrison on www.theislandwiki.org

Officers of the Order of the British Empire
Bailiffs of Jersey
1902 births
1962 deaths
Companions of the Order of St Michael and St George